The 2022 Campeonato Paranaense (officially the Campeonato Paranaense 1XBET 2022 for sponsorship reasons) was the 108th edition of the top division of football in the state of Paraná organized by FPF. The competition started on 22 January and ended on 3 April. Londrina were the defending champions but were eliminated in the quarter-finals.

Rio Branco could not inscribed all their players before their first match against FC Cascavel. Therefore the match, scheduled for 22 January (First stage, 1st round), was not played and FC Cascavel was awarded a 3–0 win by forfeit.

Coritiba won their 39th title after defeating Maringá 6–3 on aggregate in the finals.

Format
In the first stage, each team played the other eleven teams in a single round-robin tournament. The teams were ranked according to points. If tied on points, the following criteria would be used to determine the ranking: 1. Wins; 2. Goal difference; 3. Goals scored; 4. Head-to-head results (only between two teams); 5. Fewest red cards; 6. Fewest yellow cards; 7. Draw in the headquarters of the FPF.

Top eight teams advanced to the quarter-finals of the final stages. The bottom two teams were relegated to the second division. Top three teams not already qualified for 2023 Série A, Série B or Série C qualified for 2023 Série D.

Final stage was played on a home-and-away two-legged basis, with the best overall performance team hosting the second leg. If tied on aggregate, the penalty shoot-out would be used to determine the winners. Top four teams qualified for the 2023 Copa do Brasil.

Participating teams

First stage

Final stage

Bracket

Quarter-finals

|}

Group A

Operário Ferroviário qualified for the semi-finals.

Group B

Coritiba qualified for the semi-finals.

Group C

Athletico Paranaense qualified for the semi-finals.

Group D

Maringá qualified for the semi-finals.

Semi-finals

|}

Group E

Maringá qualified for the finals.

Group F

Coritiba qualified for the finals.

Finals

|}

Group G

Overall table

Top goalscorers

References

Paranaense